Brewster McCracken was Mayor pro tem of the city council in Austin, Texas, and was a candidate for the office of Mayor in Austin.

He is currently the CEO and president of Pecan Street, Inc., a non-profit research institute headquartered at The University of Texas, that focuses on technological innovations in energy consumption, water and smart grids.

Early life and career

Brewster grew up in Corpus Christi, Texas, and graduated from W. B. Ray High School. He went on to Princeton University for undergraduate study and paid his way with an Army scholarship. He then earned a Masters in Public Affairs from the Lyndon B. Johnson School of Public Affairs and a law degree from the University of Texas School of Law. He holds a mediation certification from the University of Texas Center for Public Policy Dispute Resolution.

He worked as a prosecutor in the Harris County District Attorney's Office, where he tried his first jury trial on his sixth day of work. He rose to the level of felony prosecutor before he returned to Austin.

References

Living people
Year of birth missing (living people)
People from Corpus Christi, Texas
Princeton University alumni
University of Texas School of Law alumni
Austin City Council members
Lyndon B. Johnson School of Public Affairs alumni